Pehla Nasha is a 1993 Indian Hindi-language thriller film and the debut film  of director Ashutosh Gowariker. The movie is a remake of Brian de Palma's 1984 thriller Body Double. Deepak Tijori plays the lead role alongside Pooja Bhatt, Raveena Tandon and Paresh Rawal. The film also has cameo appearances by Aamir Khan, Sudesh Berry, Rahul Roy, Shah Rukh Khan, Juhi Chawla and Saif Ali Khan as themselves.

It remains the only film to have Aamir Khan, Shah Rukh Khan and Saif Ali Khan in a scene together along with Rahul Roy and Sudesh Berry. Upon release, the film received negative reviews and failed at the box office.

Synopsis 

A down-and-out actor, Deepak Bakshi (Deepak Tijori), who has claustrophobia, goes to live as a caretaker at his friend's (Jayant Kripalani) apartment while he is away. His friend shows him a telescope which is used for spying on a neighborhood building which houses a beautiful woman. Deepak takes to spying on a regular basis. One day while spying on the woman, Deepak sees her getting attacked. He decides to get involved and lands himself into trouble with the police as he is now a suspect for murder. Later he is able to solve the mystery by overcoming his phobia and catching the main killer.

Cast 
Deepak Tijori as Deepak Bakshi
Pooja Bhatt as Monica
Raveena Tandon as Mrs. Avantika Bajaj
Paresh Rawal as Inspector Mazumdar
Jalal Agha as Mahesh Ahuja
Jayant Kripalani as Deepak's friend
Amin Hajee as John
Karim Hajee as Jack
Makrand Deshpande
Avtar Gill as Shakoor Bhai
Aditya Lakhia
Ramesh Goyal
Kaushal Kapoor
Mona Saxena
Daya Shankar Pandey
Jahangir Khan
Sudesh Berry as himself
Aamir Khan as himself
Shahrukh Khan as himself
Saif Ali Khan as himself
Juhi Chawla as herself
Rahul Roy as himself
Shammi as Deepak's Landlady
Anjan Srivastav as Interviewer
Bobby Khan as Choreographer
Sharad Sharma

Songs 
Anand Bakshi wrote all songs.

 "Aaj Raat Bas Mein (Part 1)" – Asha Bhosle
 "Mr. Zero Ban Gaya Hero" – Vinod Rathod
 "Nadiya Kinare" – Asha Bhosle, Vinod Rathod
 "Pyar Ki Raat" – Asha Bhosle, Vinod Rathod
 "Tu Hai Haseena" – Asha Bhosle, Vinod Rathod
 "Tum Kiss Liye Ho Bekarar" – Sadhana Sargam

References

External links 

 Pehla Nasha Full Movie at filmywrep

1993 films
1990s Hindi-language films
Films directed by Ashutosh Gowariker
1993 directorial debut films